Claudemir Domingues de Souza (born 27 March 1988), commonly known as Claudemir, is a Brazilian professional footballer who plays as a midfielder for Portuguese club Vizela.

Career
Born in Macaúbas, Claudemir began his career with São Carlos, before joining Dutch club Vitesse in February 2008. He moved to Danish club Copenhagen in June 2010, and Belgian club Club Brugge in January 2015.

On 18 July 2017, Claudemir signed a two season-contract with Saudi club Al-Ahli.

After just one season in Saudi Arabia, he joined Portuguese side Braga. In January 2020 he moved from Braga to Turkish side Sivasspor.

On 27 July 2021 he joined Portuguese club Vizela.

Honours
FC Copenhagen
Danish Superliga: 2010–11, 2012–13
Danish Cup: 2011–12

Club Brugge
Belgian First Division: 2015–16
Belgian Cup: 2014–15
Belgian Supercup: 2016

References

1988 births
Living people
Brazilian footballers
São Carlos Futebol Clube players
SBV Vitesse players
F.C. Copenhagen players
Club Brugge KV players
Al-Ahli Saudi FC players
S.C. Braga players
Sivasspor footballers
F.C. Vizela players
Eredivisie players
Danish Superliga players
Belgian Pro League players
Saudi Professional League players
Primeira Liga players
Süper Lig players
Association football midfielders
Brazilian expatriate footballers
Brazilian expatriate sportspeople in the Netherlands
Expatriate footballers in the Netherlands
Brazilian expatriate sportspeople in Denmark
Expatriate men's footballers in Denmark
Brazilian expatriate sportspeople in Belgium
Expatriate footballers in Belgium
Expatriate footballers in Saudi Arabia
Brazilian expatriate sportspeople in Saudi Arabia
Brazilian expatriate sportspeople in Portugal
Expatriate footballers in Portugal
Brazilian expatriate sportspeople in Turkey
Expatriate footballers in Turkey